The 2024 United States House of Representatives elections in Maryland will be held on November 5, 2024, to elect the eight U.S. representatives from the state of Maryland, one from all eight of the state's congressional districts. The elections will coincide with the 2024 U.S. presidential election, as well as other elections to the House of Representatives, elections to the United States Senate, and various state and local elections.

District 1

The 1st district encompasses the entire Eastern Shore of Maryland, including Salisbury, Harford County, and parts of north Baltimore County. The incumbent is Republican Andy Harris, who was re-elected with 54.4% of the vote in 2022.

Republican primary

Candidates

Potential
 Andy Harris, incumbent U.S. Representative (2011–present)

General election

Predictions

District 2

The 2nd district encompasses much of Baltimore and Carroll counties, along with a portion of Baltimore itself. The incumbent is Democrat Dutch Ruppersberger, who was re-elected with 59.2% of the vote in 2022.

Democratic primary

Candidates

Potential
Shelly Hettleman, state senator from the 11th district (2020–present)
Adrienne Jones, Speaker of the Maryland House of Delegates (2019–present) from the 10th district (1997–present)
 John A. Olszewski Jr., Baltimore County Executive (2018–present) and former state delegate from the 6th district (2006–2015)
 Dutch Ruppersberger, incumbent U.S. Representative (2003–present)

General election

Predictions

District 3

The 3rd district encompasses all of Howard County, much of Anne Arundel County, including Annapolis, and parts of Carroll County. The incumbent is Democrat John Sarbanes, who was re-elected with 60.2% of the vote in 2022.

Democratic primary

Candidates

Potential
Calvin Ball III, Howard County Executive (2018–present)
 Sarah Elfreth, state senator for the 30th district (2019–present)
 Steuart Pittman, Anne Arundel County Executive (2018–present)
 John Sarbanes, incumbent U.S. Representative (2007–present)

General election

Predictions

District 4

The 4th district encompasses parts of the Washington, D.C. suburbs in Prince George's County, including Landover, Laurel, and Suitland. The incumbent is Democrat Glenn Ivey, who was elected with 90.1% of the vote in 2022.

Democratic primary

Candidates

Potential
 Glenn Ivey, incumbent U.S. Representative (2023–present)

Republican primary

Candidates

Filed paperwork
 George McDermott, perennial candidate

General election

Predictions

District 5

The 5th district is based in southern Maryland, and encompasses Charles, St. Mary's, Calvert counties and a small portion of southern Anne Arundel County, as well as the Washington, D.C. suburbs of College Park, Bowie, and Upper Marlboro. The incumbent is Democrat Steny Hoyer, who was re-elected with 65.9% of the vote in 2022.

Democratic primary

Candidates

Publicly expressed interest
Steny Hoyer, incumbent U.S. Representative (1981–present)

Potential
 Angela Alsobrooks, Prince George's County Executive (2018–present)
 Steuart Pittman, Anne Arundel County Executive (2018–present)

General election

Predictions

District 6

The 6th district is based in western Maryland. It covers all of Garrett, Allegany, Washington, and Frederick counties, and extends south into the Washington, D.C. suburbs in Montgomery County, including Germantown and Gaithersburg. The incumbent is Democrat David Trone, who was reelected with 54.7% of the vote in 2022.

Democratic primary

Candidates

Filed paperwork
 George Gluck, IT consultant and perennial candidate

Potential
Marilyn Balcombe, Montgomery County councilor from the 2nd district (2022–present)
Brian Feldman, state senator from the 15th district (2013–present)
Jan Gardner, former Frederick County Executive (2014–2022)
April McClain-Delaney, U.S. Deputy Assistant Secretary of Commerce and wife of former U.S. Representative John Delaney
Aruna Miller, Lieutenant Governor of Maryland (2023–present) and candidate for this district in 2018
Craig Rice, Montgomery County councilor from the 2nd district (2010–2022) and former state delegate from the 15th district (2007–2010)
 David Trone, incumbent U.S. Representative (2019–present)

Republican primary

Candidates

Filed paperwork
 Chris Hyser, retired state trooper
 Todd Puglisi, grocery store clerk and candidate for U.S. Senate in 2022

Potential
 Neil Parrott, former state delegate from district 2A (2015–2023) and nominee for this district in 2020 and 2022
 Kelly Schulz, former Maryland Secretary of Commerce (2019–2022), Maryland Secretary of Labor (2015–2019), state delegate from district 4A (2011–2015), and candidate for governor in 2022

General election

Predictions

District 7

The 7th district includes most of Baltimore and some of its suburbs. The incumbent is Democrat Kweisi Mfume, who was reelected with 82.1% of the vote in 2022.

Democratic primary

Candidates

Potential
 Kweisi Mfume, incumbent U.S. Representative (1996–2004, 2020–present)

General election

Predictions

District 8

The 8th district encompasses the inner suburbs of Washington, D.C., and is located entirely within Montgomery County. The incumbent is Democrat Jamie Raskin, who was reelected with 80.2% of the vote in 2022.

Democratic primary

Candidates

Potential
David Blair, healthcare executive and candidate for Montgomery County Executive in 2018 and 2022
Tom Hucker, former Montgomery County councilor from the 5th district (2014–2022) and former state delegate from the 20th district (2007–2014)
Will Jawando, at-large Montgomery County councilor (2018–present) and candidate for this district in 2016
Cheryl Kagan, state senator from the 17th district (2015–present)
Nancy Navarro, former Montgomery County councilor from the 4th district (2009–2022) and candidate for Lieutenant Governor of Maryland in 2022
Tom Perez, former chair of the Democratic National Committee (2017–2021), former U.S. Secretary of Labor (2013–2017), former Maryland Secretary of Labor (2007–2009), and candidate for Governor of Maryland in 2022
Jamie Raskin, incumbent U.S. Representative (2017–present)
Joel Martin Rubin, vice mayor of Chevy Chase and candidate for this district in 2016
William Smith Jr., state senator from the 20th district (2016–present)

General election

Predictions

References

2024
Maryland
United States House of Representatives